The New Front for Democracy and Development was a social-democratic political alliance in Suriname. 
At the legislative elections (25 May 2005), the alliance won 41.2% of the popular votes and 23 out of 51 seats in the National Assembly. And at the elections of 2010 the party won 14 out of the 51 seats. 
The alliance is formed by:
National Party of Suriname (Nationale Partij Suriname)
Progressive Reform Party (Vooruitstrevende Hervormings Partij)
Democratic Alternative '91 (Democratisch Alternatief '91)
Surinamese Labour Party (Surinaamse Partij van de Arbeid)

Political party alliances in Suriname